The following is a list of "Z" codes for Medical Subject Headings (MeSH), as defined by the United States National Library of Medicine (NLM).

This list continues the information at List of MeSH codes (V04). For other MeSH codes, see List of MeSH codes.

The source for this content is the set of 2006 MeSH Trees from the NLM.

– Geographic Locations

– Africa
  – Africa, Northern
  – Algeria
  – Egypt
  – Libya
  – Morocco
  – Tunisia
  – Africa South of the Sahara
  – Africa, Central
  – Cameroon
  – Central African Republic
  – Chad
  – Congo
  – Democratic Republic of the Congo
  – Equatorial Guinea
  – Gabon
  – Africa, Eastern
  – Burundi
  – Djibouti
  – Eritrea
  – Ethiopia
  – Kenya
  – Rwanda
  – Somalia
  – Sudan
  – Tanzania
  – Uganda
  – Africa, Southern
  – Angola
  – Botswana
  – Lesotho
  – Malawi
  – Mozambique
  – Namibia
  – South Africa
  – Swaziland
  – Zambia
  – Zimbabwe
  – Africa, Western
  – Benin
  – Burkina Faso
  – Cote d'Ivoire
  – Gambia
  – Ghana
  – Guinea
  – Guinea-Bissau
  – Liberia
  – Mail
  – Mauritania
  – Niger
  – Nigeria
  – Senegal
  – Sierra Leone
  – Togo

– Americas
  – Caribbean region
  – West Indies
  – Antigua
  – Bahamas
  – Barbados
  – Cuba
  – Dominica
  – Dominican Republic
  – Grenada
  – Guadeloupe
  – Haiti
  – Jamaica
  – Martinique
  – Netherlands Antilles
  – Puerto Rico
  – Saint Kitts and Nevis
  – Saint Lucia
  – Saint Vincent and the Grenadines
  – Trinidad and Tobago
  – Virgin Islands of the United States
  – Central America
  – Belize
  – Costa Rica
  – El Salvador
  – Guatemala
  – Honduras
  – Nicaragua
  – Panama
  – Panama Canal Zone
  – Latin America
  – North America
  – Canada
  – Alberta
  – British Columbia
  – Manitoba
  – New Brunswick
  – Newfoundland
  – Northwest Territories
  – Nova Scotia
  – Nunavut
  – Ontario
  – Prince Edward Island
  – Quebec
  – Saskatchewan
  – Yukon Territory
  – Greenland
  – Mexico
  – United States
  – Appalachian region
  – Alabama
  – Georgia
  – Kentucky
  – Maryland
  – New York
  – North Carolina
  – Ohio
  – Pennsylvania
  – South Carolina
  – Tennessee
  – Virginia
  – West Virginia
  – Great Lakes region
  – Illinois
  – Chicago
  – Indiana
  – Michigan
  – Minnesota
  – New York
  – New York City
  – Ohio
  – Pennsylvania
  – Wisconsin
  – Mid-Atlantic region
  – Delaware
  – District of Columbia
  – Maryland
  – Baltimore
  – New Jersey
  – New York
  – New York City
  – Pennsylvania
  – Philadelphia
  – Midwestern United States
  – Illinois
  – Chicago
  – Indiana
  – Iowa
  – Kansas
  – Kentucky
  – Michigan
  – Minnesota
  – Missouri
  – Nebraska
  – North Dakota
  – Ohio
  – Oklahoma
  – South Dakota
  – Wisconsin
  – New England
  – Connecticut
  – Maine
  – Massachusetts
  – Boston
  – New Hampshire
  – Rhode Island
  – Vermont
  – Northwestern United States
  – Idaho
  – Montana
  – Oregon
  – Washington
  – Wyoming
  – Pacific states
  – Alaska
  – California
  – Los Angeles
  – San Francisco
  – Hawaii
  – Oregon
  – Washington
  – Southeastern United States
  – Alabama
  – Arkansas
  – Florida
  – Georgia
  – Louisiana
  – Mississippi
  – North Carolina
  – South Carolina
  – Virginia
  – West Virginia
  – Southwestern United States
  – Arizona
  – California
  – Los Angeles
  – San Francisco
  – Colorado
  – Nevada
  – New Mexico
  – Texas
  – Utah
  – South America
  – Argentina
  – Bolivia
  – Brazil
  – Chile
  – Colombia
  – Ecuador
  – French Guiana
  – Guyana
  – Paraguay
  – Peru
  – Suriname
  – Uruguay
  – Venezuela

– Antarctic regions

– Arctic regions

– Asia
  – Asia, Central
  – Kazakhstan
  – Kyrgyzstan
  – Tajikistan
  – Turkmenistan
  – Uzbekistan
  – Asia, Southeastern
  – Borneo
  – Brunei
  – Cambodia
  – East Timor
  – Indonesia
  – Laos
  – Malaysia
  – Mekong Valley
  – Myanmar
  – Philippines
  – Singapore
  – Thailand
  – Vietnam
  – Asia, Western
  – Bangladesh
  – Bhutan
  – India
  – Sikkim
  – Middle East
  – Afghanistan
  – Bahrain
  – Iran
  – Iraq
  – Israel
  – Jordan
  – Kuwait
  – Lebanon
  – Oman
  – Qatar
  – Saudi Arabia
  – Syria
  – Turkey
  – United Arab Emirates
  – Yemen
  – Nepal
  – Pakistan
  – Sri Lanka
  – Far East
  – China
  – Hong Kong
  – Tibet
  – Japan
  – Tokyo
  – Korea
  – Macao
  – Mongolia
  – Taiwan

– Atlantic islands
  – Azores
  – Bermuda
  – Falkland Islands

– Australia
  – Australian Capital Territory
  – New South Wales
  – Northern Territory
  – Queensland
  – South Australia
  – Tasmania
  – Victoria
  – Western Australia

– Cities
  – Baltimore
  – Berlin
  – Boston
  – Chicago
  – District of Columbia
  – London
  – Los Angeles
  – Moscow
  – New York City
  – Paris
  – Philadelphia
  – Rome
  – San Francisco
  – Tokyo

– Europe
  – Andorra
  – Austria
  – Belgium
  – Europe, Eastern
  – Albania
  – Baltic states
  – Estonia
  – Latvia
  – Lithuania
  – Bosnia-Herzegovina
  – Bulgaria
  – Byelarus
  – Croatia
  – Czech Republic
  – Hungary
  – Macedonia (republic)
  – Moldova
  – Poland
  – Romania
  – Russia
  – Bashkiria
  – Dagestan
  – Moscow
  – Siberia
  – Slovakia
  – Slovenia
  – Ukraine
  – Yugoslavia
  – Finland
  – France
  – Paris
  – Germany
  – Berlin
  – Germany, East
  – Germany, West
  – Gibraltar
  – Great Britain
  – Channel Islands
  – Guernsey
  – England
  – London
  – Hebrides
  – Northern Ireland
  – Scotland
  – Wales
  – Greece
  – Iceland
  – Ireland
  – Italy
  – Rome
  – Sicily
  – Liechtenstein
  – Luxembourg
  – Mediterranean region
  – Mediterranean islands
  – Cyprus
  – Malta
  – Sicily
  – Monaco
  – Netherlands
  – Portugal
  – San Marino
  – Scandinavia
  – Denmark
  – Norway
  – Svalbard
  – Sweden
  – Spain
  – Switzerland
  – Transcaucasia
  – Armenia
  – Azerbaijan
  – Georgia
  – Vatican City

– Historical Geographic Locations
  – Ancient Lands
  – Arabia
  – Armenia
  – Byzantium
  – Egypt
  – Greece
  – Persia
  – Commonwealth of Independent States
  – Armenia
  – Azerbaijan
  – Byelarus
  – Georgia
  – Kazakhstan
  – Kyrgyzstan
  – Moldova
  – Russia
  – Bashkiria
  – Dagestan
  – Moscow
  – Siberia
  – Tajikistan
  – Turkmenistan
  – Ukraine
  – Uzbekistan
  – Czechoslovakia
  – Czech Republic
  – Slovakia
  – European Union
  – Germany
  – Germany, East
  – Germany, West
  – Middle East
  – Afghanistan
  – Bahrain
  – Egypt
  – Iran
  – Iraq
  – Israel
  – Jordan
  – Kuwait
  – Lebanon
  – Libya
  – Oman
  – Qatar
  – Saudi Arabia
  – Syria
  – Turkey
  – United Arab Emirates
  – Yemen
  – New Guinea
  – Russia (pre-1917)
  – USSR
  – Armenia
  – Azerbaijan
  – Baltic states
  – Estonia
  – Latvia
  – Lithuania
  – Byelarus
  – Georgia
  – Kazakhstan
  – Kyrgyzstan
  – Moldova
  – Russia
  – Bashkiria
  – Dagestan
  – Moscow
  – Siberia
  – Tajikistan
  – Turkmenistan
  – Ukraine
  – Uzbekistan
  – Yugoslavia
  – Bosnia-Herzegovina
  – Croatia
  – Macedonia (Republic)
  – Slovenia

– Indian Ocean Islands
  – Comoros
  – Madagascar
  – Mauritius
  – Réunion
  – Seychelles

– Oceania
  – Australasia
  – Australia
  – New Zealand
  – Pacific Islands

– Oceans and Seas
  – Atlantic Ocean
  – North Sea
  – Indian Ocean
  – Mediterranean Sea
  – Pacific Ocean

– Pacific Islands
  – Melanesia
  – Fiji
  – New Caledonia
  – Papua New Guinea
  – Vanuatu
  – Micronesia
  – Guam
  – Palau
  – New Zealand
  – Polynesia
  – Hawaii
  – Pitcairn Island
  – Samoa
  – American Samoa
  – Independent State of Samoa
  – Tonga

Z01